First Presbyterian Church is a historic church building at 1903 Church Street in Galveston, Texas.
The Presbyterian congregation was organized in 1840 with the assistance of missionaries from the United States, and it met in a wooden church building from 1843 to 1872, the first church building in Galveston. The current Romanesque building was constructed in 1872 and is considered one of the best examples of Norman architecture in the region. It was designed by Nicholas J. Clayton, a prominent early Texas architect. The church was added to the National Register of Historic Places in 1979. Currently, the congregation is affiliated with  the Presbyterian Church (U.S.A.), the Synod of the Sun, and of New Covenant Presbytery.

See also

National Register of Historic Places listings in Galveston County, Texas
Recorded Texas Historic Landmarks in Galveston County

References

External links

Churches on the National Register of Historic Places in Texas
National Register of Historic Places in Galveston County, Texas
Churches completed in 1872
19th-century Presbyterian church buildings in the United States
Churches in Galveston, Texas
Presbyterian churches in Texas